The Mask Falls (German: Die Maske fällt) is a 1931 American drama film directed by William Dieterle and starring Lissy Arna, Anton Pointner and Karl Etlinger. It is the German-language remake of the 1930 film The Way of All Men.

Cast
 Lissy Arna 
 Anton Pointner 
 Karl Etlinger 
 Carla Bartheel 
 Ulrich Steindorff 
 Salka Viertel 
 Charlotte Hagenbruch 
 Leon Janney 
 Paul Weigel 
 Arno Frey 
 Anders Van Haden 
 Leo White 
 Louis King 
 Pat O'Malley

References

Bibliography
 Waldman, Harry. Missing Reels: Lost Films of American and European Cinema. McFarland, 2000.

External links

1931 films
1931 drama films
American drama films
Warner Bros. films
1930s German-language films
Films directed by William Dieterle
Remakes of American films
American multilingual films
American black-and-white films
1931 multilingual films
1930s American films